The Daytime Emmy for Outstanding Legal/Courtroom Program is a category of the Daytime Emmy Awards dedicated to the court show genre. It was first introduced in 2008. Previously, court shows were grouped miscellaneously in the talk show category. In June 2021, The People's Court helmed by Marilyn Milian won its 4th Daytime Emmy Award, which gives it the most wins for the court show genre.

Results details
In its first season, Cristina's Court became the first winner in this category in 2008. Cristina's Court went on to win 2 additional times consecutively, giving it the most wins for 9 years up until 2017, the longest length for holding the title of most wins. The court show was short-lived, however, only lasting 3 seasons and winning its final Daytime Emmy after its cancellation. In 2017, the Judge Judy courtroom series matched its number of wins, winning a 3rd time for the category.

When Judge Judy won for the first time in 2013, it was the first long-running, highly rated court show to win an Emmy. Previous to that, only short-lived, newly released court shows won this Emmy category, such as Cristina's Court. In addition, Last Shot with Judge Gunn won the award in 2012, which was only one season into its series run. This show was also cancelled early into its run, after only its 2nd season. Last Shot is the first nontraditional courtroom series to receive the award.

In 2018, Judge Mathis made history as the first court show with an African American jurist to win in this category. By June 2020, The People's Court won 3 times, equaling the number of wins of Cristina's Court and Judge Judy. In June 2021, The People's Court won its 4th Daytime Emmy Award, which officially gives it the most wins for the court show genre.

When Judy Justice, Judy Sheindlin's spin-off court show, won the award in June 2022, she became the only television judge to win this category for more than one program (her two court shows).

Nominee/winner outline

2000s

2010s

Multiple wins
4 wins
The People's Court

3 wins
Cristina's Court
Judge Judy

References

Daytime Emmy Awards
Awards established in 2008
2008 establishments in the United States